Williamson County (sometimes abbreviated as "Wilco") is a county in the U.S. state of Texas. As of the 2020 census, its population was 609,017. Its county seat is Georgetown. The county is named for Robert McAlpin Williamson (1804?–1859), a community leader and a veteran of the Battle of San Jacinto.

Williamson County is part of the Austin-Round Rock-Georgetown metropolitan statistical area. It was included with Austin in the Best Cities to Live in for 2009 by the Milken Institute. It is on both the Edwards Plateau to the west, rocky terrain and hills, and Texas Blackland Prairies in the east, rich, fertile farming land. The two areas are roughly bisected by Interstate 35.

History

Prehistoric

Much of Williamson County has been the site of human habitation for at least 11,200 years. The earliest known inhabitants of the area lived during the late Pleistocene (Ice Age), and are linked to the Clovis culture around 9,200 BC based on evidence found at Bell County's much-studied Gault Site.  One of the most important discoveries in recent times is the ancient skeletal remains dubbed the "Leanderthal Lady" because of its age and proximity to Leander, Texas. It was discovered by accident by the Texas Department of Transportation workers while drilling core samples for a new highway. The site has been extensively studied for many years, and samples from this site carbon date to the Pleistocene period around 10,500 years ago. Prehistoric and Archaic "open occupation" campsites are also found throughout the county along streams and other water sources, including Brushy Creek in Round Rock and the San Gabriel River in Georgetown. Such evidence of Archaic-period inhabitants is often in the form of relics and flint tools recovered from burned rock middens. Many such sites were inundated when the San Gabriel River was dammed to create Lake Granger.

The earliest known historical Native American occupants, the Tonkawa, were a flint-working, hunting people who followed the buffalo on foot and periodically set fire to the prairie to aid them in their hunts. During the 18th century, they made the transition to a horse culture and used firearms to a limited extent. After they were crowded out by white settlement, the Comanches continued to raid settlements in the county until the 1860s. Also, small numbers of Kiowa, Yojuane, Tawakoni, and Mayeye Indians apparently were living in the county at the time of the earliest Anglo settlements.

Thrall flood
On September 9 and 10, 1921, the remnants of a hurricane moved over Williamson County. The 24-hour rainfall total ending 7 am on September 10, 1921 at a U.S. Weather Bureau station in Thrall remains the national official 24-hour rainfall record. Thrall's rainfall was  during 6 hours,  during 12 hours, and  during 18 hours. Eighty-seven people drowned in and near Taylor, and 93 in Williamson County. This storm caused the most deadly floods in Texas, with a total of 215 fatalities.

1997 tornado outbreak
On May 27, 1997, Williamson County was hit by the worst tornado outbreak in county history. The 1997 Central Texas tornado outbreak caused 20 tornadoes including an F-5 (the strongest rating used for tornadoes on the Fujita scale), which remains the only F-5 to strike Williamson County. The F-5 tornado killed 27 people and completely destroyed the Double Creek Estates neighborhood in the city of Jarrell, Texas, located in far northern Williamson County. Another strong tornado, an F-3, struck Cedar Park, killing one person. Two F-2 tornadoes also struck Williamson County. The outbreak cost the county over $190 million in damages and a total of 30 fatalities.

Modern growth
Williamson County's fast growth rate is due in large part to its location immediately north of Austin coupled with Austin's rapid expansion northward; Austin's city limits cross into Williamson County. Most of the growth has been residential, but large employers, such as Dell's international headquarters, have also changed Williamson County from a bedroom community into a community where citizens can live and work in the same general vicinity. This has transformed the county over recent years into a dynamic, self-sustaining community with less dependency on Austin. Major retail and commercial developments began appearing from 1999 to present, including the Rivery in Georgetown, and the Premium Outlet Mall, the IKEA-area retail, and the La Frontera mixed-use center in Round Rock. Health care and higher education have also become major factors in the county's growth. Two new colleges and two new hospitals have opened since 2015. Another significant factor has been the opening of the North Loop 1 and Texas State Highway 45 toll roads, which have made Williamson County more accessible to Austin.

Geography

The area is divided into two regions by the Balcones Escarpment, which runs through the center from north to south along a line from Jarrell to Georgetown to Round Rock. It features undulating, hilly brushland with an abundance of Texas live oak, prickly pear cactus, and karst. It has dark clay and rich, fertile soils for agriculture, but is quickly being developed as the county's population continues to increase and expand out. Williamson County is drained in the center and south by the San Gabriel River, the county's only river, and in the north by creeks that run into the Lampasas and Little Rivers north of the county line.

Topography

Williamson County's eastern portion lies within the low-lying prairie areas east of the Balcones Escarpment (also known as the Balcones Fault, though it is not an active fault). It begins a piedmont, a foot-friendly fall line of slightly sloping land downward to the coastal area, an area of the Blackland Prairie consisting of rich, fertile, clay-containing soils, where the land is still used for agriculture, growing cotton and other crops and raising cattle.  These prairie lands essentially run from Williamson County to the Gulf Coast, and have a rich heritage of being farmed by German, Polish, and other settlers.

West of the escarpment is the beginning of the "upland" Texas Hill Country, characterized by rocky terrain with thin layers of soil on top of limestone. Some ranching occurs in the uplands, but mostly it has been the target of residential development because of the rolling terrain, vistas, hardwood trees, abundant wildlife, and rivers and streams (the same reason early Indians camped in the area). The Hill Country areas are characterized by their porous "vugular" (honeycombed) rock, where rainwater percolates down to replenish the Edwards Aquifer. For that reason, development restrictions are in place and several endangered species are protected by the US Fish and Wildlife Service (USFWS).Interstate 35, the county's main artery, runs along the fault line dividing the two distinct regions.

Environmentally protected areas
Balcones Canyonlands National Wildlife Refuge is in the Texas Hill Country northwest of Austin, including parts of western Williamson County.  The refuge was formed in 1992 to conserve habitat for two endangered songbirds, the golden-cheeked warbler and the black-capped vireo, and to preserve Texas Hill Country habitat for other wildlife species. The refuge augments a similarly named preserve in Austin, the Balcones Canyonlands Preserve. The vegetation found in the Hill Country includes various oaks, elms, and Ashe juniper trees (often called "cedar" in Texas). The golden-cheeked warbler and black-capped vireo depend on different successional stages of this vegetation, and both nest in the Edwards Plateau, the warbler exclusively. Some protected areas are open to visitors, such as the Berry Springs Park.

Endangered species
Williamson County is home to five endangered species. Two are songbirds protected by the Balcones Canyonlands Preserve in Travis and Williamson Counties. The other three are invertebrate species found only in Williamson County, which live in the cavelike fissures on the west side of the county. Karst topography is the name for the honeycomb-type limestone formations (including caves, sinkholes, and fissures) typical of the county's limestone geology west of Interstate 35. In the 1990s, a group of concerned landowners, individuals, and real-estate developers formed the Northern Edwards Aquifer Resource Council with the goal of obtaining a USFWS 10-A permit (known as an incidental take permit) for the county by identifying and preserving sufficiently many caves with endangered species to ensure survival of the species. These species would be preserved through voluntary donations of land rather than required setbacks, grants, and other involuntary means typically enforced on landowners without an incidental take permit. The group transferred its successful work on an environmental impact statement to the county in 2002 and a county-wide 10-A permit was obtained in October 2008. Property owners are able to participate in the county's 10-A permit by applying through the WCCF.

Adjacent counties
 Bell County (north)
 Milam County (east)
 Lee County (southeast)
 Bastrop County (southeast)
 Travis County (south)
 Burnet County (west)

Demographics

Note: the US Census treats Hispanic/Latino as an ethnic category. This table excludes Latinos from the racial categories and assigns them to a separate category. Hispanics/Latinos can be of any race.

As of the census of 2010, 422,679 people, 152,606 households, and 111,514 families resided in the county. The population density was 373 people per square mile (144/km2). The 162,773 housing units averaged 144 per square mile (55/km2). The racial makeup of the county was 80.9% White, 7.1% African American, 1.3% Native American, 5.8% Asian, 0.3% Pacific Islander, 6.9% from other races, and 3.2% from two or more races. About 23.2% of the population was Hispanic or Latino of any race.

Of the 111,514 households, 39.1% had children under the age of 18 living with them, 57.9% were married couples living together, 10.8% had a female householder with no husband present, and 26.9% were not families. Around 21.2% of all households were made up of individuals, and 17.4% had someone living alone who was 65 years of age or older. The average household size was 2.74 and the average family size was 3.20.

In the county, the age distribution was 28.7% under 18, 11.9% from 15 to 24, 31.6% from 25 to 44, 23.2% from 45 to 64, and 8.9% who were 65 or older. The median age was 34 years.

The median income for a household in the county was $60,642, and for a family was $66,208. Males had a median income of $43,471 versus $30,558 for females. The per capita income for the county was $24,547. About 3.40% of families and 4.80% of the population were below the poverty line, including 5.40% of those under age 18 and 5.90% of those age 65 or over.

Government and politics

Commissioners' court

The Commissioners Court is the overall governing and management body of Williamson County, and is responsible for all budgetary decisions in addition to setting the tax rate each year. Among its duties is the administration of all county business, including the building and maintenance of county roads and bridges. Commissioners' courts are governing bodies of county government in several US states, including Texas. The principal functions of the commissioners' court are legislative and executive. Although called courts, commissioners' courts generally exercise only limited judicial powers.

The commissioners' court consists of five members. The county judge presides as chairman, and is elected every four years by voters countywide. Four commissioners are elected by single-member precincts every four years.

 County judge - Honorable Bill Gravell, Jr.
 Precinct 1 - Commissioner Terry Cook
 Precinct 2 - Commissioner Cynthia Long
 Precinct 3 - Commissioner Valerie Covey
 Precinct 4 - Commissioner Russ Boles

Congressional and state representation
In recent decades, Williamson County has been a strongly Republican county. Before the 2018 elections, every federal and state elected official from the county was a Republican. Williamson County is in Texas's 31st U.S. Congressional District, which is represented by John Carter (R). It is in Texas Senate District 5, and is represented by State Senator Charles Schwertner (R). Williamson County includes three Texas House of Representatives Districts: 20, 52, and 136. District 20 is represented by Republican Terry Wilson, 52 by Caroline Harris, and 136 by Democrat John Bucy III.

Presidential election results
Williamson County was once a solidly Democratic county. In 1976, it voted for President Jimmy Carter by a higher percentage (55%) than did voters in Travis County (52%). In 1980, however, the county swung dramatically to support Ronald Reagan, giving him 56% of the vote, almost equal to Carter's 1976 total. In subsequent years, the county became increasingly Republican, following a pattern similar to those of other suburban Texas counties. In 2004, President George W. Bush won 68% of the vote in Williamson County. John McCain received 55% of the vote to Barack Obama's 42% in the 2008 election. In 2012, Republican Mitt Romney defeated Obama, 59% to 38%. In 2016, Donald Trump beat Hillary Clinton, 51%-41%. However, the county narrowly swung Democratic in 2020, with Joe Biden winning a plurality over Trump, 49% to 48%.

In recent years, Williamson County has again leaned toward the Democratic Party, with Beto O'Rourke edging out Ted Cruz in the 2018 U.S. Senate race, and James Talarico and John Bucy III both defeating Republican incumbents to win election to the State House of Representatives in districts mostly in Williamson County. However in the same 2020 election, county voters reelected Republican John Cornyn to the U.S. Senate as well as Republican John Carter to the U.S. House of Representatives.

Election turnout reflects the county's tremendous growth. In 1960, only 7,870 votes were cast, compared to 289,555 in 2020.

Sun City Texas
One of the most significant growth factors of modern Williamson County is the location of a new Sun City community in Georgetown. It is part of the chain of Sun City communities started by Del E. Webb Construction Company (now a division of PulteGroup). Residency is restricted to persons over age 55 (at least one person in a couple has to be 55 or older) and the community is generally oriented toward retirees.

As originally planned, the project would double the size of Georgetown's population. Sun City Texas is made up mostly of single-family dwellings, but also has duplexes. The Sun City project includes three golf courses (Legacy Hills, White Wing, and Cowan Creek). Although the community attracts residents from all over, most come from within Texas to stay close to their original homes. Vocal opposition to the project has occurred, especially at the start during the zoning process, with arguments against the size of the community, its effect on Georgetown as a family-oriented town, concerns about the costs of providing city utilities, concern about lowered city and Williamson County property taxes, which are fixed for retirees under Texas law, and the disproportionate effect of city voting.

By and large, though, the community has been welcomed and accepted by the Georgetown populace. In the 2008 city elections, for example, two residents of Sun City were the only candidates for mayor of Georgetown. They also were both formerly elected city council members.

Economy

Agriculture
Williamson County was an agrarian community for most of the 19th and early 20th centuries. Cotton was the dominant crop in the area between the 1880s and the 1920s, and Williamson County was the top producer of cotton in Texas.  Primarily to transport bales of cotton, the county was served by two national railroads, the International-Great Northern Railroad, which eventually merged into the Missouri Pacific, and the Missouri–Kansas–Texas Railroad. The town of Taylor in eastern Williamson County became the primary center for cotton production, cotton ginning, and compressing cotton into bales to transport by rail.

Other agriculture activities, farming, and dairying were also a part of rural Williamson County east of the Balcones Fault, and ranching occurred to the west in the Hill Country area. Both gradually gave way to more modern business, services, and retail as the area became more urban, but cattle ranching is still a major business in some areas of the county, and cotton is still a significant crop eastward toward Hutto and Taylor.

Business
Williamson County's largest employer was once Dell Computer in Round Rock, employing roughly 16,000 employees. Retail and health care, including St. David's Hospital, Scott & White, Seton Medical Center Williamson hospital (a level II certified trauma center), and the A&M Health Science Center are among the area's largest employers. Other than Dell, retail is the second-most significant business group in the county. The new IKEA store and Premium Outlet Mall in Round Rock, as well as those in the La Frontera mixed-use project in Round Rock are significant to the county. Wolf Ranch and The Rivery are also major retail centers in Georgetown. In addition, higher education has a large positive effect on the county with the opening of the Texas State University Campus in Round Rock and the Austin Community College campus. The Round Rock campus is the single largest campus in the ACC system, providing two-year degrees and training in the high-tech sector, nursing, and other specialties.

County courthouse

The current courthouse, built in 1911, is an example of Neoclassical Revival architecture. The courthouse has had a tumultuous past, surviving three major renovations and many modifications, including the demolition of its key architectural features in 1966.  With the assistance of the Texas Historical Commission and preservation-minded county citizens and officials, the courthouse was returned to its original 1911 state during a major 2006–2007 renovation, once again becoming a focal point of the county.

Williamson County flag
The stars on the flag surrounding the state of Texas represent the 33 viable communities identified by Clara Stearns Scarbrough in her 1973 book, Land of Good Water.  In 1970, these communities ranged in population from 20 people in Norman's Crossing to more than 10,000 residents in Taylor. Establishing how many communities exist in Williamson County today is difficult, because the determination of "community" is subjective and without set criteria. However, in Williamson County in 2004, 11 towns had populations over 1,000 people, and seven towns had populations above 5,000.

Education
These school districts serve Williamson County:
 Bartlett ISD (partly in Bell County, small portion in Milam County)
 Burnet Consolidated ISD (mostly in Burnet County, small portion in Llano County)
 Coupland ISD (very small portion in Travis County)
 Florence ISD (small portion in Bell County)
 Georgetown ISD
 Granger ISD
 Hutto ISD
 Jarrell ISD
 Leander ISD (partly in Travis County)
 Lexington ISD (mostly in Lee County, very small portion in Milam County)
 Liberty Hill ISD
 Pflugerville ISD (mostly in Travis County)
 Round Rock ISD (small portion in Travis County)
 Taylor ISD
 Thorndale ISD (mostly in Milam County)
 Thrall ISD

Higher education
 Southwestern University (Georgetown)
 Texas State University Round Rock Campus
 Texas A&M Health Science Center (Round Rock)
 National American University (Georgetown)
 Temple College (Hutto and Taylor)

Austin Community College is the designated community college for most portions of the county.
 Sites: Round Rock, Cedar Park and Leander
 Austin Community College also purchased a site in Leander, Texas, in 2010 for an additional future Williamson County campus.

Areas in Granger, Hutto, Taylor, and Thrall ISDs are within Temple Junior College District. Areas in Florence ISD are within Central Texas College District. Areas in Lexington ISD are within Blinn Junior College District.

Media
The newspapers that serve Williamson County include the Round Rock Leader, Williamson County Sun (Georgetown), Taylor Press, Hutto News, Hill Country News (Leander), Liberty Hill Independent, and Tribune-Progress (Bartlett).  In 2005 Community Impact Newspaper was founded.  The Austin American-Statesman also has significant coverage in Williamson County.

Transportation

Major highways
  Interstate 35
  U.S. Highway 79
  U.S. Highway 183
  State Highway 29
  State Highway 45
  State Highway 95
  State Highway 130
  State Highway Loop 1
  183A Toll Road
  State Highway 195

Roads
  RM 620
  FM 970
  FM 971
  FM 972
  FM 973
  FM 1325
  RM 1431
  RM 2243
  RM 2338
  FM 3405

Communities

Cities (multiple counties)

 Austin (mostly in Travis County and a small part in Hays County)
 Bartlett (partly in Bell County)
 Cedar Park (small part in Travis County)
 Leander (small part in Travis County)
 Pflugerville (mostly in Travis County)
 Round Rock (small part in Travis County)
 Thorndale (mostly in Milam County)

Cities

 Coupland
 Florence
 Georgetown (county seat)
 Granger
 Hutto
 Jarrell
 Leander
 Liberty Hill
 Taylor
 Thrall
 Weir

Census-designated places
 Brushy Creek
 Jollyville (former; annexed by Austin)
 Santa Rita Ranch
 Serenada
 Sonterra

Unincorporated communities
 Jonah
 Macedonia
 Norman's Crossing
 Rice's Crossing
 Schwertner
 Walburg

Ghost towns
 Palm Valley

Notable people

 Nolan Ryan is a retired Major League Baseball pitcher and current president and majority owner of the Texas Rangers.  Ryan played in a major league record 27 seasons for the New York Mets, California Angels, Houston Astros, and Texas Rangers, from 1966 to 1993. He was inducted into the Baseball Hall of Fame in 1999.
 Sam Bass (1851–1878), outlaw and train robber, was killed in a famous shootout in Round Rock in 1878.  The shootout is re-enacted once a year as part of the Old Settlers Day celebration in Round Rock.
 King Fisher (1854–March 11, 1884) was a Texas rancher and gunfighter who lived in Williamson County during his boyhood.
 Dan Moody, a native of Taylor, was the 30th Governor of Texas from 1927 to 1931; he is remembered as a reformer and an opponent of the Ku Klux Klan and as the district attorney for Williamson County.

In popular culture
 The television show Kevin (Probably) Saves the World is set in Williamson County.
 Williamson County is depicted in the Coen Brothers movie Blood Simple.
 The 1996 Nora Ephron film Michael was shot principally in Georgetown and in and around Williamson County.
 The Texas Chain Saw Massacre, original 1974 version, primary filming occurred at a dilapidated farmhouse on the site of what is now La Frontera.  In 1993, the house was moved to Kingsland, Texas, and restored to become a restaurant at The Antlers Hotel.

See also

 List of museums in Central Texas
 National Register of Historic Places listings in Williamson County, Texas
 Recorded Texas Historic Landmarks in Williamson County

References

External links

 Williamson County government's website
 Robert M. Williamson's entry in the Biographical Encyclopedia of Texas hosted by the Portal to Texas History.
 

 
1848 establishments in Texas
Populated places established in 1848
Texas Hill Country